Bourges 18 was a football club based in Bourges, France. In the summer of 2008, FC Bourges, which formerly spent eleven seasons in the Division 2, merged with Bourges-Asnières 18 to create Bourges 18. The club's colours were red and blue. In 2021, a merger with Bourges Foot created the new club Bourges Foot 18.

History
 1966: Foyer Saint-François Bourges and Racing Club de Bourges were amalgamated to form FC Bourges.
 1970–1994: The club played intermittently in the Division 2
 1994–1998: The club played in the Championnat National but went bankrupt in January 1998, and was henceforth known as FC Bourges 18
 2005: after another bankruptcy, the club changed its name to Bourges Football Olympique Club
 2006: The club is renamed once more and becomes Bourges Football
 2008: Bourges Football and Bourges Asnières 18 amalgamate to become Bourges 18.
2021: Bourges 18 and Bourges Foot merge to create Bourges Foot 18.

Honours
 1975–76: Champions of the Division 3 Group Centre-West
 1995–96: Champions of the National 2
 1966–67, 1998–99, 2008–09: Champions of the Division d'Honneur Centre

Managers
Incomplete list

External links
 History 
 History (author: Roland Narboux)

 
Association football clubs established in 1966
1966 establishments in France
2021 disestablishments in France
Association football clubs disestablished in 2021
Defunct football clubs in France
Bourges
Football clubs in Centre-Val de Loire
Sport in Cher (department)